Cyril Edward Bruce-Smith (4 April 1892 – 5 March 1963) was a Scottish actor who began his career as a child in 1900 and went on to appear in numerous stage plays as well as over 100 films between 1914 and his death almost 50 years later. The son of Frederick and Elsa Smith; his mother travelled with him on his engagements during his boyhood.

Career
Smith first became known as a child stage actor in 1900, and by the age of 13 in 1905, he travelled to New York to appear as Cosmo in a production of the J. M. Barrie play Alice-Sit-By-The Fire, opposite Ethel Barrymore; at the time, The New York Times hailed him as "one of the best-known child actors in England".  Smith's film career began in 1914 in the Wilfred Noy-directed Old St. Paul's and he appeared in almost 20 other silent films of the 1910s and 1920s before making the transition to sound. From the early 1930s until his death, he featured in dozens of films ranging from the quota quickies of the 1930s and the B-movies of the 1940s and 1950s, through to more prestigious productions starring names such as Vivien Leigh, Trevor Howard and Deborah Kerr. Smith was not a name-billed film actor, and many of his roles were uncredited bit parts or minor roles with generic titles such as "Publican", "Reporter" or "Bailiff"; however towards the end of his life he achieved several more prominent billings after finding a late-career niche portraying scatty and doddery elderly men. For instance, in 1956, he had a leading role in the Peggy Mount comedy, Sailor Beware! and a similar leading role in the Hylda Baker comedy, She Knows Y'Know (1962) . Smith also moved into television, as Merlin the magician in the 1956 ITV series The Adventures of Sir Lancelot which was also a success in the U.S. and as Harold Wormold in the first series of the BBC sitcom Hugh and I in 1962.

Smith suffered a heart attack in December 1962 and died on 5 March 1963, aged 70.

Filmography

 Old St. Paul's (1914) - Boy (film debut)
 Pallard the Punter (1919) - Horace Callender
 Walls of Prejudice (1920) - Karpat
 The Fordington Twins (1920) - Cyril Raleigh
 Class and No Class (1921) - Lord Daventry
 Fires of Fate (1923) - Lord Howard Cecil
 The Desert Sheik (1924)
 The Innocents of Chicago (1932) - Gangster
 The Mayor's Nest (1932) - Magistrate
 The Man from Toronto (1933) - Gossiping Villager (uncredited)
 The Good Companions (1933) - Leonard Oakroyd
 Channel Crossing (1933) - Beach
 Friday the Thirteenth (1933) - Fred the Driver
 The Roof (1933) - McNair
 The Black Abbot (1934) - Alf Higgins
 Waltzes from Vienna (1934) - Secretary (uncredited)
 It's a Cop (1934) - Lewis
 Evergreen (1934) - Stage Manager (uncredited)
 Wild Boy (1934) - Kennel Boy
 Oh, Daddy! (1935) - Alfred the Butler (uncredited)
 Key to Harmony (1935) - Fred
 Hello, Sweetheart (1935) - Mac McGuire
 Me and Marlborough (1935) - Corporal Fox
 Bulldog Jack (1935) - Duke (uncredited)
 Lend Me Your Wife (1935) - Charles Harwood
 Brown on Resolution (1935) - William Brown, Jr.
 The Tunnel (1935) - Casualty Announcer (uncredited)
 Music Hath Charms (1935) - BBC Producer (uncredited)
 Pot Luck (1936) - Miller
 The Last Journey (1936) - Postal Sorter (uncredited)
 Jack of All Trades (1936) - (uncredited)
 O.H.M.S. (1937) - Steward (uncredited)
 Dark Journey (1937) - Baron von Marwitz's Valet (uncredited)
 The Frog (1937) - PC Balder
 Storm in a Teacup (1937) - Councillor
 The Challenge (1938) - Customs Officer
 No Parking (1938) - Stanley
 Sidewalks of London (1938) - Black Face
 The Return of the Frog (1938) - Maggs
 Sword of Honour (1939) - Bright
 Traitor Spy (1939) - Det. Sgt. Trotter
 The Flying Squad (1940) - Tiser
 They Flew Alone (1942) - Radio Operator On 'Aquitania'
 We'll Smile Again (1942) - Assistant Cutter (uncredited)
 When We Are Married (1943) - Fred Dyson
 Fanny by Gaslight (1944) - Publican (uncredited)
 One Exciting Night (1944) - Joe
 Meet Sexton Blake (1945) - Belford
 On Stage Everybody (1945) - Talent Show Winner
 Don Chicago (1945) - Flash Kelly
 The Agitator (1945) - Dunham
 Murder in Reverse? (1945) - Customer
 The Echo Murders (1945) - P.C. Smith
 This Man Is Mine (1946) - Taxi Driver (uncredited)
 Appointment with Crime (1946) - Det. Sgt. Charlie Weeks
 School for Secrets (1946) - Flight Sgt. Cox
 They Made Me a Fugitive (1947) - Bert
 So Well Remembered (1947) - 2nd Publican (uncredited)
 If Winter Comes (1947) - Truck Driver (uncredited)
 Daughter of Darkness (1948) - Joe
 Escape (1948) - Policeman (uncredited)
 One Night with You (1948) - Second Ticket Collector
 Romance on the High Seas (1948) - English Bartender (uncredited)
 No Room at the Inn (1948) - Store Detective (uncredited)
 It's Hard to Be Good (1948) - Fred Hobson
 Hills of Home (1948) - Signor Rimini (uncredited)
 The History of Mr. Polly (1949) - Mr. Voules
 Conspirator (1949) - Detective Inspector
 The Interrupted Journey (1949) - Publican
 The Rocking Horse Winner (1949) - Bailiff
 The Body Said No! (1950) - Sergeant
 Old Mother Riley Headmistress (1950) - Maltby
 The Third Visitor (1951) - Detective Horton
 The Dark Man (1951) - Samuel Denny
 No Highway in the Sky (1951) - Airport Officer (uncredited)
 Mystery Junction (1951) - Station Master
 Green Grow the Rushes (1951) - Hubert Hewitt
 Night Was Our Friend (1951) - Rogers the Reporter
 Judgment Deferred (1952) - (uncredited)
 Stolen Face (1952) - Alf Bixby, Innkeeper
 Mother Riley Meets the Vampire (1952) - Mr. Paine, the rent collector
 The Lost Hours (1952) - Det. Sgt. Roper
 Women of Twilight (1952) - Flinton (uncredited)
 Hindle Wakes (1952) - Hotel Porter
 The Steel Key (1953) - Boat Owner (uncredited)
 Wheel of Fate (1953) - Perce
 The Angel Who Pawned Her Harp (1954) - Dog Owner
 Svengali (1954) - 1st Stage Manager
 Burnt Evidence (1954) - Alf Quinney
 The Brain Machine (1955) - Prison Warder
 John and Julie (1955) - Ticket Inspector
 Value for Money (1955) - Writ Server (uncredited)
 Who Done It? (1956) - Refrigeration Plant Worker (uncredited) 
 Sailor Beware! (1956) - Henry Hornett
 The Adventures of Sir Lancelot (1956-1957, TV Series) - Merlin
 The Rough and the Smooth (1959) - Taxi Driver
 Light Up the Sky! (1960) - 'Spinner' Rice
 Watch it, Sailor! (1961) - Henry Hornett
 On the Fiddle (1961) - Ticket Collector
 Over the Odds (1961) - Sam
 She Knows Y'Know (1962) - Joe Worswick (final film)

References

External links
 

1892 births
1963 deaths
Scottish male film actors
Scottish male silent film actors
Scottish male stage actors
Scottish male television actors
People from Peterhead
20th-century Scottish male actors